"Perfekte Welle" is a song by German band Juli. It was written by band members Simon Triebel and Andreas Herde and produced by O.L.A.F. Opal for their debut album Es ist Juli (2004). It served as band's debut single and peaked at number two on the German and Austrian Single Charts. In December 2004, after the tsunami in south-east Asia, many German television and radio stations announced that they would no longer play the song as a mark of respect to the tsunami victims. An Afrikaans version was released in South Africa by the group Shine4, called "Perfekte Wêreld" (Perfect World).

Formats and track listings

Other versions 
The song 'Perfekte Welle' was covered in frenchcore style in 2021 by hardstyle DJ: BadRabbitz.

Charts

Weekly charts

Year-end charts

Certifications

References

2004 singles
Juli (band) songs
2004 songs
Songs written by Simon Triebel
German-language songs